Finland competed at the 1906 Intercalated Games in Athens, Greece. Four athletes, all men, competed in eleven events in two sports.

Athletics

Track

Field

Wrestling

Greco-Roman

References

Nations at the 1906 Intercalated Games
1906
Intercalated Games